Lielauce Manor is a manor house built in late classical or Empire style in the 19th century for Count Medem on the south shore of Lielauce Lake, in the historical region of Semigallia, in Latvia.

History 
Lielauce manor in 17th century was owned by Duke of Courland and Semigallia Friedrich Kettler who in 1624 together with all his court lived in the manor. Current manor building is built in the beginning of 19th century when it was bought by von Medem family. At the end of the 19th. century property was bought by count von Pahlen as his summer residence. During Christmas of 1900 manor building was heavily damaged by fire. In 1901 restoration works started. As a result building got more Neo - Classical appearance.
After Latvian agrarian reforms of 1920 manor building was used as a school. Today building is owned by Latvia University of Life Sciences and Technologies. Interiors are preserved in several rooms.

See also
List of palaces and manor houses in Latvia

References

External links
 

Manor houses in Latvia
Dobele Municipality
Semigallia